The MATS/2 is a scatterable Italian circular, plastic-cased minimum metal blast resistant anti-tank blast mine. It uses a pneumatic fuse which is resistant to shock and blast similar to the fuse fitted to the TS-50. The mine's plastic case is waterproof, and the mine can be scattered from a helicopter traveling at up to 200 km/h using the Tecnovar DAT dispensing system. A secondary fuse well is provided in the base for the fitting of anti-handling devices.

The mine's manufacturer claims the mine is capable of disabling any armoured vehicle.

The mine is no longer in production, but is in service with the Italian army.

Specifications
 Diameter: 260 mm
 Height: 90 mm
 Weight: 4 kg
 Explosive content: 2.6 kg of T4 (RDX) or Composition B
 Operating pressure: less than 180 to 310 kg

References
 Jane's Mines and Mine Clearance 2005-2006
 

Anti-tank mines of Italy